The 11th District of the Iowa House of Representatives in the state of Iowa.

Current elected officials
Gary Worthan is the representative currently representing the district.

Past representatives
The district has previously been represented by:
 Michael K. Kennedy, 1971–1973
 Alvin V. Miller, 1973–1977
 Betty Jean Clark, 1977–1983
 Daniel P. Fogarty, 1983–1993
 James A. Meyer, 1993–1999
 Steve Kettering, 1999–2003
 Henry Rayhons, 2003–2013
 Gary Worthan, 2013–present

References

011